Davor Lovren (born 3 October 1998) is a Croatian professional footballer who plays for Jarun Zagreb.

Club career
Lovren made his professional debut in the Croatian First Football League for GNK Dinamo Zagreb on 14 May 2016 in a game against NK Lokomotiva.

In June 2017, he joined Fortuna Düsseldorf in Germany's 2. Bundesliga on a two-year loan. However, on 11 July 2018, Düsseldorf bought Lovren permanently for €750,000.

Personal
He is the younger brother of Zenit defender Dejan Lovren. He was named after Croatian former footballer Davor Šuker.

References

External links
 

1998 births
Living people
Footballers from Munich
German people of Croatian descent
German people of Bosnia and Herzegovina descent
Association football forwards
German footballers
Croatian footballers
Croatia youth international footballers
GNK Dinamo Zagreb II players
GNK Dinamo Zagreb players
Fortuna Düsseldorf players
NK Slaven Belupo players
Fortuna Düsseldorf II players
Croatian Football League players
2. Bundesliga players
Regionalliga players
Bundesliga players
First Football League (Croatia) players